William James Stirling  (4 February 1953 – 9 November 2018) was a physicist who served as the first Provost of Imperial College London. He was appointed to this role in August 2013 and retired in August 2018.

Biography
He was born in Belfast and  grew up in Glengormley, Co. Antrim, attending first Glengormley Primary School and then Belfast Royal Academy. He was admitted as an undergraduate to Peterhouse, Cambridge, in 1972, taking a First in Part IB and Part II of the Mathematical Tripos and a Distinction in Part III. He graduated BA in 1975, and continued at Peterhouse to take a PhD (1979) in Theoretical Particle Physics in the Department of Applied Mathematics and Theoretical Physics. He won a Smith's Prize for Mathematics in 1978.

After periods of research in the US, Cambridge and the European Organization for Nuclear Research (CERN) in Geneva, Stirling was appointed to a lectureship at Durham University in 1986. In 2000 he became the first Director of the University's new Institute for Particle Physics Phenomenology (IPPP), which together with the Institute for Computational Cosmology, forms part of the Ogden Centre for Fundamental Physics, and before moving to Cambridge was Pro-Vice Chancellor (Research) from 2005 to 2008. At Cambridge he was the Jacksonian Professor of Natural Philosophy, Head of the Cavendish Laboratory, and Fellow of Peterhouse at the University of Cambridge.

From 2001 to 2003, he served as the first Chair of the Particle Physics and Astronomy Research Council  Science Committee, the research council's top-level scientific advisory committee. He was a member of the Physics Sub-Panel in two Research Assessment Exercises (2001 and 2008) and was Deputy Chair of the 2008 panel.

Stirling's research area was theoretical particle physics. In a research career spanning more than 30 years, he published more than 300 research papers, including some of the most frequently cited papers in the physical sciences. His particular research interest was particle physics phenomenology – the interface between theory and experiment – and he worked closely with experimentalists at research laboratories in Europe and the United States.  He was a member of the internationally renowned MSTW collaboration that studies the ‘parton’ structure of the proton.

In recognition of his contribution to particle physics research, Stirling was elected to the Fellowship of the Royal Society in May 1999.  He was appointed a CBE in the 2006 New Year Honours list, for services to science. He was a member of the Council of the Royal Society in 2007-8, and from 2009 served on the Council of the Science and Technology Facilities Council (STFC).

The Stirling Lecture, an annual public lecture hosted by the IPPP in Durham since 2008, is named in his honour.

References

External links
 James Stirling web page

Scientific publications of James Stirling on INSPIRE-HEP

1953 births
2018 deaths
Academics of Durham University
Jacksonian Professors of Natural Philosophy
Alumni of Peterhouse, Cambridge
British physicists
Commanders of the Order of the British Empire
Fellows of Peterhouse, Cambridge
Fellows of the Institute of Physics
Fellows of the Royal Society
People associated with CERN
Provosts of Imperial College London
People educated at the Belfast Royal Academy
Scientists from Belfast
Scientists of the Cavendish Laboratory
Physicists from Northern Ireland